Lycurus setosus is a species of grass in the family Poaceae, commonly known as the bristly wolfstail. It is found at high elevations in dry areas of the south western United States, as well as in Bolivia and Argentina.

Description
Lycurus setosus is a perennial mountain grass with a tufted habit. They are rough or bristly and have a white midrib below. They are also bristly. It can be distinguished from the rather similar common wolfstail (Lycurus phleoides) by the erect culms, longer ligules and differently shaped tips to the upper leaves.

Habitat and range
It is found on arid, free draining land, on mesas and rocky slopes. It occurs in the Southwestern United States and in  northern Mexico. A separate population occurs in similar habitats in Argentina and Bolivia.

References

Chloridoideae
Flora of the United States